Naked Ambition may refer to:
Naked Ambition (2003 film), a 2003 Hong Kong sex comedy film
Naked Ambition 2, aka 3D Naked Ambition; 2014 sequel to the 2003 film
Naked Ambition: An R Rated Look at an X Rated Industry, a 2007 documentary and 2007 photobook
Naked Ambition: Women Who Are Changing the Porn Industry (2005 book), a non-fiction book by Carly Milne
Madonna: Naked Ambition (2000 documentary), British telefilm by Angus Cameron (director)
"Naked Ambition" (1995 TV episode), episode 2 from series 1 of Faith in the Future
"Naked Ambition" (2000 TV episode), episode 15 from  season 4 of King of the Hill
"Naked Ambition" (2001 TV episode), episode 9 from season 4 of PB&J Otter, see List of PB&J Otter episodes
"Naked Ambition" (2009 TV episode), episode 9 from season 2 of the U.S. edition ofMake Me a Supermodel
"Naked Ambition" (2011 TV episode), episode 2 from season 1 of Face Off